Stenidea is a genus of longhorn beetles of the subfamily Lamiinae, containing the following species:

subgenus Amblesthidus
 Stenidea affinis (Fairmaire, 1894)
 Stenidea bituberosa Breuning, 1940
 Stenidea elongata (Breuning, 1939)
 Stenidea excavata Breuning, 1942
 Stenidea insignis (Distant, 1898)
 Stenidea lateralis Aurivillius, 1908
 Stenidea nigrolineata Breuning, 1942
 Stenidea proxima Breuning, 1942
 Stenidea setipennis Breuning, 1970
 Stenidea simplex (Fåhraeus, 1872)
 Stenidea verticalis (Thomson, 1868)

subgenus Amblesthis
 Stenidea alutacea (Thomson, 1860)
 Stenidea besnardi Breuning, 1971
 Stenidea nemorensis (Thomson, 1860)
 Stenidea seriepilosa Kirsch, 1889
 Stenidea varii Breuning, 1981

subgenus Stenidea
 Stenidea albida (Brullé, 1838)
 Stenidea annulicornis (Brullé, 1838)
 Stenidea costigera Demelt, 1982
 Stenidea densevestita (Fairmaire, 1890)
 Stenidea fairmairei Aurivillius, 1922
 Stenidea floccifera (Kolbe, 1893)
 Stenidea gemina (Pascoe, 1888)
 Stenidea genei (Aragona, 1830)
 Stenidea gertiana (Sama, 1996)
 Stenidea gomerae (Sama, 1996) 
 Stenidea hesperus Wollaston, 1863
 Stenidea lorenzoi (García, 2002)
 Stenidea niveopicta Demelt, 1982
 Stenidea pilosa (Wollaston, 1862)
 Stenidea schurmanni (Sama, 1996)
 Stenidea troberti Mulsant, 1843

References

 
Desmiphorini